Kyhna station is a railway station in the municipality of Kyhna, located in the Nordsachsen district in Saxony, Germany.

References

Railway stations in Saxony
Buildings and structures in Nordsachsen